Michael Leo Hilliard (11 March 1903 – 3 August 1982) was an Irish Fianna Fáil politician. 

He was born 11 March 1903 in Navan, County Meath, fifth child of James Hilliard, a farmer and cattle dealer, and Mary Hilliard (née O'Brien). He was educated at St Finian's College, Mullingar, he left in 1920 to take part in the IRA's independence campaign. A company captain in 4th Battalion, 2nd Meath Brigade, in 1920 he was involved in enforcing the Belfast boycott and in April 1921 was promoted to brigade intelligence officer Hillard fought on the side of the Anti-Treaty IRA during the Irish Civil War.

He remained active in the IRA until about 1932, when he left to join Fianna Fáil. From 1934 he represented the party on Navan Urban District Council. He was first elected to Dáil Éireann as a Fianna Fáil Teachta Dála (TD) for the Meath–Westmeath constituency at the 1943 general election. During his career he served in the governments of Seán Lemass and Jack Lynch. During his tenure as Minister for Posts and Telegraphs Hilliard oversaw the introduction of a television service in Ireland, RTÉ. He served as Minister for Defence from 1965 to 1969.

He retained his Dáil seat at eight further general elections, switching to the Meath constituency after constituencies were revised for the 1948 general election. However, at the 1973 general election, he lost his seat to his party colleague Brendan Crinion. He did not contest any further Dáil elections.

While a TD in 1973, Hilliard was appointed a Member of the European Parliament as part of Ireland's short-lived first delegation.

His son Colm Hilliard was Fianna Fáil TD for Meath from 1982 to 1997.

References

 

1903 births
1982 deaths
Fianna Fáil MEPs
Fianna Fáil TDs
Irish Republican Army (1919–1922) members
Irish Republican Army (1922–1969) members
Irish television people
MEPs for the Republic of Ireland 1973
Members of the 11th Dáil
Members of the 12th Dáil
Members of the 13th Dáil
Members of the 14th Dáil
Members of the 15th Dáil
Members of the 16th Dáil
Members of the 17th Dáil
Members of the 18th Dáil
Members of the 19th Dáil
Ministers for Defence (Ireland)
Parliamentary Secretaries of the 16th Dáil
People of the Irish Civil War (Anti-Treaty side)
Politicians from County Meath
People educated at St Finian's College